Grace Gregory (1901 – November 14, 1985) was an American set decorator. She was nominated for two Academy Awards in the category Best Art Direction.

Selected filmography
Gregory was nominated for two Academy Awards for Best Art Direction:
 The Country Girl (1954)
 Love with the Proper Stranger (1963)

References

External links

American set decorators
1901 births
1985 deaths